Mat Lyons (born  28 October 1976) is a former Australian television actor, with a string of credits to his name stretching from the 1980s. Among his best known early roles were as Dino in adventure series Kelly and Colin Brownley in police drama Skirts. Most recently, Lyons starred in The Beast from Hell.

Lyons is the older brother of actor Christopher Lyons, from comedy series The Bob Morrison Show and SeaChange.

Lyons now resides in Melbourne.

References

 "Lyons, M.", abc.net, Melbourne, 14 December 2005.

1976 births
Living people
Australian male television actors
Male actors from London
Place of birth missing (living people)
British emigrants to Australia